Halli (899) is a modified, enlarged Hylje-design, and acts as a combined pollution cleanup and vehicle transport ship. She is also operated by a civilian crew from the Ministry of Environment but is under Navy control. The vessel can act as a landing ship and logistic support vessel. The  bow ramp can be used to load or unload vehicles up to 48 tons. The vessel is equipped with a  waste-collection tank. The ship was built in 1986 and refitted in 2010.

References 

Ships of the Finnish Navy
Ships built in Rauma, Finland
1986 ships
Naval ships of Finland